Arthur Treloar (29 September 1884 – 5 March 1927) was an Australian rules footballer who played for the Fitzroy Football Club in the Victorian Football League (VFL).

Notes

External links 

1884 births
1927 deaths
Australian rules footballers from Victoria (Australia)
Fitzroy Football Club players